The 1943 Baltimore mayoral election saw the election of Theodore McKeldin.

General election
The general election was held May 4.

References

Baltimore mayoral
Mayoral elections in Baltimore
Baltimore